Abba is a town in Nwangele Local Government Area (LGA) in Imo State, Nigeria. The first traditional ruler of Abba ancient kingdom was Eze Madukwem Emmanuel Unaka (Uburu 1 of Abba), succeeded by Eze Ndubueze Maduabuchukwu (Uburu II of Abba). Abba consists of four communities. Listed in order of seniority they are Umuokpara, Umudurunna, Ekiti-Afor, and Ogwuaga, which all consist of twenty-eight villages.

Prominent families in Abba
There are many famous and well to do families in Abba. They consist of traders, educators, businessmen, lawyers, engineers, and doctors. The Nwoye, Akwiwu, Ozigbu, Orjiakor, Ekegbu and Ofoha families are examples of important families in Abba. Other examples are the Uwagbuo family,the Unaka family, the Akanno, the Nwafor family, the Ekwueme the Nnabuike family from the Royal house of the Nnawuihe family, the Chineme family, the Asuzu family, the Ohiaeri family, the Iwuoha Family, the Ugwokaegbe family where the first Reverend father in Duru N'ihe came from, the Oguamanam family, the Chimezie family, the Aladiri family, the Amaraegbu family, the Nwachukwu family, the Chikezie family, the Alinnor family, the Onwuachumba family, the Uzomah family, the Azonobi family, and the Obialo family, Ewuzie family, Ukadike family, Mba family, And not to omit the Anomneze family where the first Eze came from.
 
It is also noteworthy that one of the oldest churches in Abba, St. Stephen Anglican Church was built by Late Chief S. O Akwiwu.

History of Abba
Etymologically, the word Abba means father, which in common usage is called "Abba Nna". Historically, Abba in Nwangele LGA and Abam in Bende LGA of Abia State originated from the same place. Centuries ago, Field Marshall Ochiagha Uburu left Bende and fought through several towns in a move to demonstrate his military prowess and extract respectability. Uburu finally decided to stay and establish himself in a rocky grove that was known as Ebu-Ogbugha Nkume (rock of ages) and is the location of the present day Abba.

The four villages of Abba
According to oral history, Ochiagha Uburu originally had five children. They were Okpara, Osuama, Durunna, Ekitiafor, and Ogwuaga. Osuama is now in Mbano. This is because Osuama did the same thing that his father did and in the process, attained more land than his father. 

Umuokpara, the descendants of Okpara, consist of all the villages whose ancestors were children of Okpara and these include: Umulolo,Umuduruagwu, Umuonuna,etc. The same goes for Umudurunna, which comprises villages such as: Duru ni'ihe, Umu-Ezealibe, Umuozhibiri 1 & 2 i.e Umuokam and Umuokwaraehie, Okwei, Duru-Emeaghara, and Umuduruonunu. Ekitiafor and Ogwuaga consist of villages where the inhabitants are descendants of Ekitiafor and Ogwuaga. These villages include Oteke and Amukwe which are villages in Ekitiafor.

References 

Towns in Imo State